Remix Your Imagination is the first remix album by the Australian singer songwriter, Deni Hines. The album was released in Japan in November 1997 and in Australia in July 1998.

Track listings

References

1997 remix albums
Deni Hines albums
Remix albums by Australian artists
Mushroom Records albums